Charles Buchanan may refer to:

People
 Charles Allen Buchanan (1904–2001), a Commandant of Midshipmen at the United States Naval Academy
 Charles Pakenham Buchanan (1874–1924), mayor of Brisbane, Queensland
 Charles James Buchanan (1899–1984), High Sheriff of Nottinghamshire
 Charles Buchanan (fl. before 1958), manager and co-owner of the Savoy Ballroom, New York City, New York, U.S.

Other uses
 Rev. Charles Buchanan, a character in the American television show The 5 Mrs. Buchanans